Lt. Col. Alexander Learmonth (1829 - 10 March 1887) was a British Army officer and a Conservative Party politician.

Life
Born at 4 Princes Street in Edinburgh, the eldest son of John Learmonth, Alexander Learmonth was educated at University College, Oxford, where he matriculated in 1847 before entering the Inner Temple to study law. He joined the Army and became a Colonel in the 17th Lancers.

On retiring from the Army he was elected Conservative MP for Colchester on 3 November 1877, sitting from 1870 to 1880.

In 1859, he married Charlotte Lyons, the eldest daughter of Lieutenant-General Humphrey Lyons. The couple had 7 children.

By 1878, his extravagant London lifestyle caused his bankruptcy and the lands he had inherited in Edinburgh from his father were sold to the builder James Steel.

References

External links
 

Alumni of University College, Oxford
Members of the Inner Temple
17th Lancers officers
Conservative Party (UK) MPs for English constituencies
UK MPs 1868–1874
UK MPs 1874–1880
1829 births
1887 deaths
Military personnel from Edinburgh
Politicians from Edinburgh